My good Dad is a 1970 Soviet drama film directed by Igor Usov.

Plot 
The film tells about a boy named Petya, who enjoys a happy life in Baku. But suddenly the war broke out and his father went to the front, but before that he told Petya that he should always be kind and sympathetic. Father died in the war, but his father's words became his principles.

Cast 
 Aliagha Aghayev
 Sasha Arutyunov as Boba
 Eldar Azimov
 Rafiq Azimov
 Nikolay Boyarskiy as Uncle Gosha
 Masha Bryanskaya
 Aleksandr Demyanenko
 Tarlan Farzaliyev		
 Lyudmila Gurchenko
 Gamal Gvardeyev

References

External links 
 

1970 films
1970s Russian-language films
Soviet drama films
1970 drama films